The Case of Conrad Cooper is a 2014 short film based on an idea from Wendy J. Menara and Mike Fuhrmann about the invisible homeless and the vanishing middle class. It contains no spoken dialogue. 
In 2014, the film was chosen as Best Experimental Short at the California International Shorts Festival, and received honorable mention in the 2015 lafr awards.

Storyline

The film follows a day in the life of Conrad Cooper. Cooper was once asuccessful familyman; however, he as lost almost everything. Conrad Cooper lives in the past, stuck in today, and is afraid of tomorrow. Like most days, Conrad is on his way somewhere and he has to be on time. If anyone happens to notice, he’s just another man, wearing a suit and tie, carrying a briefcase, blending in.
But Conrad’s fear of the future follows him like an ever present ghost.
Finally, in his darkest hour, something catches his eye – something so simple, so innocent that he’d completely forgotten, had barely even noticed – at the time. At least for now, he believes there’s hope for tomorrow.

Cast

 Adam Venker as Conrad Cooper
 Paul Louis Harrell as Street Punk / Shadow Man
 Sean Burgos as Harmonica Man
 Melissa Biethan as Stylish Lady
 Pili Valdés as Mother at Bus Stop (as Pili Valdes)
 Ava Harris as Girl at Bus Stop
 Willow Hale as Old Lady on Porch
 Alec VanOwen as Newspaper Boy (as Alec VanOwen Nance)
 Terroon Kibwe	as Mr. Big Shot
 Natalie Gelman as Street Guitarist
 Ron McPherson as Door Man

Soundtrack
Theme song of "The Case of Conrad Cooper“
 "No One’s Listening" by Charles Simmons & Deborah Lee

There is also an Ibiza House Remix of the theme song.

Production
The film was completed despite an unsuccessful crowdfunding campaign on Indiegogo.

References

External links

 
 
 

2014 drama films
2014 films
American silent short films
2014 short films
American drama films
2010s English-language films
2010s American films
Silent American drama films